Republika is a Serbian magazine (periodical), published from 1989 to 2015 in Belgrade.

The magazine was started by a group of Yugoslavian intellectuals, members of the Association for Yugoslav Democratic Initiative. The periodical has been published by the cooperative Res Publica. First editor-in-chief was its founder Nebojša Popov until 2010, his successor became Zlatoje Martinov and one of the editorial staff members was Mirko Đorđević.

References

External links
Official website

Defunct magazines published in Serbia
Defunct political magazines
Magazines established in 1989
Magazines disestablished in 2015
Mass media in Belgrade
Political magazines published in Serbia
Serbian-language magazines